Deister (10 February 1971 – 27 August 2000) was a Hanoverian horse ridden by Paul Schockemöhle and Hartwig Steenken. He won many top international competitions in the sport of show jumping. He was three times European Champion. He stood 16.3½ hh (171 cm).

Achievements

Winner, Individual Gold Medal 1981 European Championships in Munich, Germany
Winner, Individual Gold Medal 1983 European Championships in Hickstead, England
Winner, Individual Gold Medal 1985 European Championships in Dinard, France
Individual Silver Medal 1979 European Championships in Rotterdam, The Netherlands
Winner, Team Gold Medal 1981 European Championships in München
Team Silver Medal 1979 European Championships in Rotterdam
Team Bronze Medal 1983 European Championships in Hickstead
Team Bronze Medal 1985 European Championships in Dinard
Team Silver Medal 1982 Show Jumping World Championships in Dublin, Ireland
6th Individual 1982 World Championships, Dublin
Team Bronze Medal 1984 Olympics in Los Angeles
7th Individual 1984 Olympics in Los Angeles
Winner of the 1983 King George V Gold Cup, England
Winner of the 1984 Aachen (CHIO) Grand Prix
Winner of the 1982 Hickstead Derby 
Winner of the 1986 Hickstead Derby
Deister won 5 German Championships with Schockemöhle (1980, 1982, 1983, 1986 & 1987)

References

External links
Deister's pedigree
Photo of Deister jumping
 Video of Deister at Gothenburg 1986

German show jumping horses
Individual warmbloods
Horses in the Olympics
1971 animal births
2000 animal deaths
Individual male horses
Hanoverian horses